Ahmet Akça is a Turkish entrepreneur, the Chairman of the leading Turkish mobile network operator and technology company Turkcell and a philanthropist.

References

Turkish businesspeople
Living people
Year of birth missing (living people)
Place of birth missing (living people)
Middle East Technical University alumni
Istanbul University alumni